Álvaro Alejandro Fuerte Michetti (born 7 March 1971) is a Uruguayan football manager, currently in charge of Progreso.

Career
Born in Las Piedras, Fuerte was named manager of hometown side Juventud's youth categories in 2014, after previously playing for the club as a football and basketball player. On 21 December 2017, he was named manager of the first team in the Segunda División.

Fuerte led Juventud to the Primera División in his first season, but was sacked on 31 August 2019. On 21 August 2021, he replaced Maxi Viera at the helm of Progreso also in the top tier.

References

External links

1971 births
Living people
People from Las Piedras, Uruguay
Uruguayan football managers
Uruguayan Primera División managers
Uruguayan Segunda División managers
C.A. Progreso managers
Juventud de Las Piedras managers